Numerius Fabius Pictor may refer to:

 Numerius Fabius Pictor (antiquarian)
 Numerius Fabius Pictor (consul)